Abraham Edwards (September 7, 1796 – February 5, 1870) was a Massachusetts politician who served as the fifth Mayor of Cambridge, Massachusetts.

Early life
Edwards was born in Boston, Massachusetts  to Abraham and Martha Edwards on September 7, 1796.

Family life

Edwards married Anne Moore.

Education
Edwards prepared for college under the tutorship of Charles Folsom.  After studying under Folsom, Edwards entered Harvard.  Edwards graduated from Harvard in 1819. After his graduation from Harvard, Edwards went on to study law with Judge Fay.

Professional career
Edwards was admitted to the Massachusetts Bar in Middlesex County, in September 1822.  Edwards began his practice of law in Brighton, Massachusetts,  which was in Middlesex County at the time.

In 1832 Edwards moved to Cambridge.

Political career
Edwards was elected the fifth  Mayor of Cambridge, Massachusetts, serving from April 1854 to January 1855.

Death
Edwards died in Cambridge on February 5, 1870.

Notes

1796 births
1870 deaths
Harvard College alumni
Mayors of Cambridge, Massachusetts
19th-century American politicians
People from Boston